Punta Gabarró or Punta de Gabarró is a mountain of the Montcalm Massif.

This peak was named after Pere Gabarró i Garcia, a Catalan mountaineer who found a new route to climb the Pica d'Estats.

This mountain is included in the Parc Natural de l'Alt Pirineu together with Pica d'Estats and Pic Verdaguer.

See also
List of Pyrenean three-thousanders
List of mountains in Catalonia

References

External links
 Ressenya a la Federació d'Entitats Excursionistes de Catalunya

Mountains of Catalonia
Mountains of the Pyrenees